The Miller's Beautiful Wife is a 1955 Italian comedy film directed by Mario Camerini, that stars Marcello Mastroianni, Sophia Loren and Vittorio de Sica. A remake of the director's 1934 film, 'Il capello a tre punte”, it is based on the Spanish novel El sombrero de tres picos that came out in 1874.

Plot
In the south of Italy under Spanish rule, the young miller Luca lives with his wife Carmela. A good-looking and sociable couple, they host lunches at their mill for local dignitaries, including the Spanish governor Don Teofilo. When the governor makes advances to Carmela, she asks him for favours in return.

His inept administration of the province leads to an outbreak of popular anger at the annual celebration of the town's patron saint and among the many arrested and detained is Luca. Donna Dolores, the governor's neglected wife, realises that he has gone too far in his handling of the inhabitants and begs him to release them all, which he does apart from Luca. 

At nightfall he goes out to the mill, planning to catch Carmela alone, but in the dark falls into the chilly millstream. Rescued by Carmela, he is put to bed with a hot toddy while his clothes dry by the fire. Meanwhile Luca has escaped and, creeping into the darkened mill, sees not only Don Teofilo's clothes but also the governor in the marital bed. 

A way of getting even comes to him. Dressing in the governor's clothes, he goes to Don Teofilo's house and finds Donna Dolores in her bed. She responds eagerly to his advances, but he breaks off and reveals his identity, saying he has had his revenge. When Don Teofilo creeps back in the miller's nightshirt, Luca is able to humiliate him in front of his wife. She advises her contrite husband not only to avoid other men's wives but also to treat the inhabitants more justly.

Don Teofilo never discovers if his wife did succumb to Luca, who now spends more time with Carmela and less in socialising.

Cast
 Vittorio De Sica as Don Teofilo
 Sophia Loren as Carmela
 Marcello Mastroianni as Luca
 Paolo Stoppa as Gardunia
 Yvonne Sanson as Donna Dolores
 Mario Passante
 Carlo Sposito (as Carletto Sposito)
 Virgilio Riento as Salvatore
 Elsa Vazzoler
 Angela Lavagna
 Amalia Pellegrini
 Silvio Bagolini
 Emilio Petacci
 Michele Riccardini
 Pietro Tordi
 Nino Marchesini

References

External links

1955 films
1950s Italian-language films
1955 comedy films
Films based on works by Pedro Antonio de Alarcón
Films directed by Mario Camerini
Films produced by Carlo Ponti
Films produced by Dino De Laurentiis
Remakes of Italian films
Fictional millers
Italian comedy films
1950s Italian films